Víctor Manuel Torres González  (born May 8, 1969) is a Puerto Rican politician affiliated with the New Progressive Party (PNP). He has been a member of the Puerto Rico House of Representatives since 2017 representing District 23.

Early years and studies
Born in Yauco, Puerto Rico, Torres González studied at the Ponce College of Technology. In the year 1990, he graduated with high honors in computer programming career. A year later, he completed banking and accounting studies at the Instituto de Banca y Comercio.

Political career
He began his career in public service in 2002 to be appointed Vice mayor of the city of Yauco under the leadership of the mayor, Hon. Abel Nazario Quiñones. In 2005 he worked as an advisor on municipal Affairs of the Senate of Puerto Rico for Senate president Hon. Kenneth McClintock. After completing his duties in the Senate presidency, was named Superintendent of the Capitol of Puerto Rico. Was elected to the Puerto Rico House of Representatives at the 2016 elections for the 23rd district. He is vice-President of the Commission of the South region and member of the Commissions of finance, ethics, consumer affairs, banking and insurance and municipal affairs.

Personal life
He is married to Jessicalís Rivera and they have one son and two daughters.

References

Living people
1969 births
New Progressive Party members of the House of Representatives of Puerto Rico
People from Yauco, Puerto Rico